Gilligan's Island is an American sitcom created and produced by Sherwood Schwartz. The show's ensemble cast features Bob Denver, Alan Hale Jr., Jim Backus, Natalie Schafer, Tina Louise, Russell Johnson and Dawn Wells. It aired for three seasons on the CBS network from September 26, 1964, to April 17, 1967. The series follows the comic adventures of seven castaways as they try to survive on an island where they are shipwrecked. Most episodes revolve around the dissimilar castaways' conflicts and their unsuccessful attempts to escape their plight, with Gilligan usually being responsible for the failures.

Gilligan's Island ran for 98 episodes. All 36 episodes of the first season were filmed in black and white and were later colorized for syndication. The show's second and third seasons (62 episodes) and the three television film sequels (aired between 1978 and 1982) were filmed in color.

The show received solid ratings during its original run, then grew in popularity during decades of syndication, especially in the 1970s and 1980s when many markets ran the show in the late afternoon. Today, the title character of Gilligan is recognized as an American cultural icon.

Premise 
The two-man crew of the charter boat SS Minnow and five passengers on a "three-hour tour" from Honolulu run into a typhoon and are shipwrecked on an uncharted island somewhere in the Pacific Ocean. (The exact location is said to be in conflicting longitudes/latitudes in three episodes.) Their efforts to be rescued are typically thwarted by the inadvertent conduct of the hapless first mate, Gilligan. In 1997, show creator Sherwood Schwartz explained that the underlying concept, people with different characters and backgrounds being in a situation where they need to learn how to get along and cooperate with each other to survive, is still "the most important idea in the world today".

Cast and characters 

 Bob Denver as Willie Gilligan, the hapless first mate of the S.S. Minnow. His first name is given in the pilot episode.
 Alan Hale Jr.  as Captain Jonas Grumby ("The Skipper"), the captain of the S.S. Minnow
 Jim Backus as Thurston Howell III, a Wall Street millionaire
 Natalie Schafer as Eunice "Lovey" Howell, Thurston's wife
 Tina Louise as Ginger Grant, a Hollywood movie star
 Russell Johnson as Professor Roy Hinkley, Ph.D. ("The Professor") 
 Dawn Wells as Mary Ann Summers, a wholesome farm girl from Winfield, Kansas, who won the trip and tour in a lottery
 Charles Maxwell (uncredited) as the voice of the recurring radio announcer

Episodes

Pilot episode 
The pilot episode, "Marooned", was filmed in November 1963. The pilot featured seven characters (as in the series), but only four of the characters—and their associated actors—were carried forward into the series: Gilligan (Denver), the Skipper (Hale) and the Howells (Backus and Schafer).

Because of the three significant character and casting changes between the pilot episode and the first series episode, the pilot was not shown before the series first aired on September 26, 1964. The original pilot eventually aired over 29 years later on TBS.

The three characters who did not carry forward from the pilot were two secretaries and a high school teacher. In the pilot, the scientifically inclined Professor was instead a high school teacher played by John Gabriel. Ginger the movie star was still red-haired Ginger, but she worked as a secretary and was played by Kit Smythe. She was more sarcastic than the later incarnation. Mary Ann the Kansas farm girl was instead Bunny, Ginger's co-worker, played as a cheerful "dumb blonde" by Nancy McCarthy.

The pilot's opening and ending songs were two similar calypso-styled tracks written by John Williams and performed by Sherwood Schwartz impersonating singer Sir Lancelot. The lyrics of both differ from those of the TV series and the pilot's opening theme song was longer. The short scenes during this initial music include Gilligan taking the Howells' luggage to the boat before cast-off and Gilligan trying to give a cup of coffee to the Skipper during the storm that would ultimately maroon the boat.

After the opening theme song and credits end, the pilot proper begins with the seven castaways waking up on the beached SS Minnow. It continues with them performing various tasks, including exploring the island, trying to fix the transmitter, building huts and finding food. Contrary to some descriptions, the pilot's storylines contained no detailed accounts of the pilot characters' backgrounds. The pilot concludes with the ending theme song and credits. The background music and even the laugh tracks of the pilot appear all but identical to those used during the series.

First broadcast episode 
The first episode actually broadcast, "Two on a Raft", is sometimes incorrectly referred to as the series pilot. This episode begins with the same scene of Gilligan and the Skipper awakening on the boat as in the pilot (though slightly differently cut, to eliminate most shots of the departed actors) and continues with the characters sitting on the beach listening to a radio news report about their disappearance. No equivalent scene or background information is in the pilot, except for the description of the passengers in the original theme song. Rather than reshooting the rest of the pilot story for broadcast, the show just proceeded. The plot thus skips over the topics of the pilot; the bulk of the episode tells of Gilligan and the Skipper setting off on a raft to try to bring help but unknowingly landing back on the other side of the same island.

The scene with the radio report is one of two scenes that reveal the names of the Skipper (Jonas Grumby) and the Professor (Roy Hinkley); the names are used in a similar radio report early in the series. The name Jonas Grumby appears nowhere else in the series except for an episode in which the Maritime Board of Review blames the Skipper for the loss of the Minnow. The name Roy Hinkley is used one other time when Mr. Howell introduces the Professor as Roy Huntley and the Professor corrects him, to which Mr. Howell replies, "Brinkley, Brinkley."

The plot for the pilot episode was recycled into that season's Christmas episode, "Birds Gotta Fly, Fish Gotta Talk", in which the story of the pilot episode, concerning the practical problems on landing, is related through a series of flashbacks. Footage featuring characters that had been recast was reshot using the current actors. For scenes including only Denver, Hale, Backus and Schafer, the original footage was reused.

Last broadcast episode 
The last episode of the show, "Gilligan the Goddess", aired on April 17, 1967 and ended just like the rest, with the castaways still stranded on the island. It was not known at the time that it would be the series finale, as a fourth season was expected but then canceled.

Typical plots 
The shipwrecked castaways want to leave the island and various opportunities frequently present themselves but invariably fail usually due to some bumbling error committed by Gilligan. Sometimes this results in Gilligan saving the others from some unforeseen flaw in their plan.

Most episodes of Gilligan's Island use variations of five recurring basic plots:

 Life on the island. A running gag is the castaways' ability to fashion an array of useful objects from bamboo, gourds, vines and other local materials. Some are everyday items, such as eating and cooking utensils, while others (such as a remarkably efficient lie detector apparatus) are stretches of the imagination. Russell Johnson noted in his autobiography that the production crew enjoyed the challenge of building these props. These bamboo items include framed huts with thatched grass sides and roofs, along with bamboo closets strong enough to withstand hurricane-force winds and rain, the communal dining table and chairs, pipes for Gilligan's hot water, a stethoscope and a pedal-powered car.
 Visitors to the island. Another challenge to a viewer's suspension of disbelief is the remarkable frequency with which the remote, uncharted island is visited by an assortment of people who repeatedly fail to help rescue the castaways.
 Dream sequences in which one of the castaways dreams they are some character related to that week's story line. All of the castaways appeared as other characters within the dream. In later interviews and memoirs, nearly all the actors stated that the dream episodes were among their favorites.
 A piece of news concerning one or more of the castaways is heard over the radio and causes distress or discord among them.
 The appearance or arrival of unusual objects to the island, such as a World War II naval mine, an old silent motion picture camera and costumes, a crate of radioactive vegetable seeds, plastic explosives, a robot, a live lion, a jet pack, or a "Mars Rover" that the scientists back in the United States think is sending them pictures of Mars.

Most of the slapstick comedic sequences between Hale and Denver were inspired by Laurel and Hardy, particularly when Hale breaks the fourth wall by looking directly into the camera expressing his frustration with Denver's clumsiness as Oliver Hardy often did.

Production 
The show was filmed at the CBS Radford Studios complex in Studio City, Los Angeles. The same stage was later used for The Mary Tyler Moore Show and Roseanne, the latter of which featured a daydream parodying Gilligan's Island in one episode. The lagoon was drained and used as a parking lot during the show's off-season and was the last surviving element of the show when it was demolished in 1997 as part of an expansion project.

Four boats were used as the SS Minnow. One was used in the opening credits and rented in Ala Wai Yacht Harbor in Honolulu. Another, the Bluejacket, was used in the opening credits shown during the second and third seasons and eventually turned up for sale on Vancouver Island in August 2006, after running aground on a reef in the Hecate Strait on the way south from Alaska. One boat was used for beach scenes after being towed to Kauai in Hawaii. The fourth Minnow was built on the CBS Studios set in the second season. The Minnow was named in reference to Newton Minow, chairman of the U.S. FCC, in response to Minow's landmark 1961 speech "Television and the Public Interest"; the speech lambasted television producers for producing, among other things, "formula comedies about totally unbelievable" characters and creating a "vast wasteland" of bad television.

The final day of filming the pilot was Friday, November 22, 1963, the day of the assassination of President John F. Kennedy. The cast and crew learned of the assassination late that morning, Hawaii time. Between the filming of scenes, they crowded around a radio listening to news bulletins. A reminder of the tragedy appears in the opening sequence of the show's first season, when the theme song is played. As the Minnow is leaving the harbor and heading out to sea, an American flag flying at half staff can be seen in the background.

The United States Coast Guard occasionally received telegrams and  letters from concerned citizens, who apparently did not realize it was a scripted show, pleading for them to rescue the people on the deserted island. The Coast Guard forwarded these to producer Sherwood Schwartz. In homage to those telegrams, the film Rescue from Gilligan's Island showed the successful rescue where Gilligan lights a fire aboard the castaways' makeshift raft and is chastised for a thoughtless, dangerous action by the others. However, the resultant smoke attracts the attention of a US Coast Guard helicopter, whose pilot commends Gilligan's fire; otherwise, the castaways would have been adrift and unnoticed.

Casting 
Bob Denver was not the first choice to play Gilligan; actor Jerry Van Dyke was offered the role, but he turned it down, believing that the show would never be successful. He chose instead to play the lead in My Mother the Car, which premiered the following year and is frequently cited as one of the worst television shows of all time; it was canceled after one season. The producers looked to Bob Denver, the actor who had played Maynard G. Krebs, the beatnik in The Many Loves of Dobie Gillis.

Natalie Schafer had it written into her contract that no close-ups would be made of her, but after a while in the series it was forgotten. Schafer was 63 when the pilot was shot, although reportedly no one on the set or in the cast knew her real age and she refused to divulge it. Originally, she only accepted the role because the pilot was filmed on location in Hawaii. She looked at the job as nothing more than a free vacation, as she was convinced that a show this silly would "never go".

Tina Louise clashed with producer Sherwood Schwartz because she initially believed that she was hired as the central character. The character of Ginger was originally written as a hard-nosed, sharp-tongued temptress, but Louise argued that this portrayal was too harsh and refused to play her as written. A compromise was reached; Louise agreed to play Ginger as a Marilyn Monroe/Jayne Mansfield type. Her temperament reportedly made her difficult to work with, but when it came time to shoot, she was always professional. Louise continued to disagree with producers over her role and was the only cast member who refused to appear in any of the three post-series TV movies, saying that the role had killed her career as a serious actress. After many years of distancing herself from the show, she appeared in a reunion of the cast on a late-night television talk show in 1988 and on an episode of Roseanne in 1995 when the Roseanne cast re-enacted Gilligan's Island. In the pilot episode, the character of Ginger was played by actress Kit Smythe.

John Gabriel was originally cast as the academic character, a high school teacher. After testing, the network didn't believe the character scored well with the audience. Auditions were held for the revised role of the Professor, which included Dabney Coleman, but was ultimately won by Russell Johnson. Prior to his acting career, Johnson had served as a bombardier in 44 combat missions over the Pacific during World War II. On March 4, 1945, the B-25 he was flying as the navigator was shot down, killing the copilot and breaking both of Johnson's ankles. At the time of his audition he was working in film and not very interested in a television show unless it was going to be his own. His film career had been going well, tallying several science fiction and western film credits, including a role opposite Ronald Reagan in the 1953 film Law and Order. In addition to film, Johnson had landed roles on multiple popular television series such as The Adventures of Superman, The Twilight Zone and The Outer Limits. With six other leads, his agent had to talk him into going to the audition, but after meeting Sherwood Schwartz, he started to warm up to the idea of playing the Professor. In discussing his role, he laughingly said he was unsure what was more difficult, remembering the Professor's technically oriented lines, or looking up what they meant.

Dawn Wells was a former Miss Nevada when she auditioned for the Mary Ann role. Her competition included Raquel Welch and Pat Priest. The pilot episode featured a different character ("Bunny") played by actress Nancy McCarthy. After it was shot, the network decided to recast the roles of the Professor and the two young women. Mary Ann became a simple farm girl from Winfield, Kansas.

Theme song 
The music and lyrics for the theme song, "The Ballad of Gilligan's Isle", were written by Sherwood Schwartz and George Wyle. One version was used for the first season and another for the second and third seasons. In the original song, the Professor and Mary Ann, originally considered "second-billed co-stars", were referred to as "the rest", but with the growing popularity of those characters, their names were inserted into the lyrics in the second season. The Gilligan theme song underwent this one major change because star Bob Denver personally asked studio executives to add Johnson and Wells to the song. When the studio at first refused, saying it would be too expensive to reshoot, Denver insisted, even going so far as to state that if Johnson and Wells were not included, he wanted his name out of the song as well. The studio caved in and "the Professor and Mary Ann" were added.  The theme song in the original pilot did not even mention the character Ginger, with the last two mentioned by name being "the Millionaire and Mrs. Millionaire" followed by "...and the other tourists".

The first-season version was recorded by the folk group The Wellingtons. The second-season version, which incorporated more of a sea shanty sound, was uncredited, but according to Russell Johnson in his book Here on Gilligan's Isle, it was performed by a group called the Eligibles.

The show's original pilot episode featured a calypso theme song by future film composer John Williams and different lyrics. The original length of the voyage was "a six-hour ride", not "a three-hour tour". John Williams (or Johnny Williams as he was often listed in the show credits) also started out as the composer of the incidental music for the show (from 1964 to 1965), but was replaced by Gerald Fried for the remaining seasons (1965–1967).

Later parody and homage 
The band Little Roger and the Goosebumps recorded "Stairway to Gilligan's Island," a parody of Led Zeppelin's "Stairway to Heaven", substituting the words to the Gilligan's Island theme song. In 1987, The Iceman parodied Madonna's "La Isla Bonita" as "La Isla Gilligan." "Weird Al" Yankovic recorded a song called "Isle Thing", a parody of Tone Lōc's "Wild Thing", about a rapper whose girlfriend introduces him to the show. Yankovic also mentions the show in his song "Stop Draggin' My Car Around" and he used one verse from the closing theme lyrics in "Amish Paradise" (1996), a parody of Coolio's "Gangsta's Paradise" (1995). The song has also been covered by many bands, including Bowling for Soup for the TBS show The Real Gilligan's Island. Israel Kamakawiwoole also recorded a comic tribute to the theme song on his album E Ala E. The TV series ALF had a 2-part episode "Somewhere Over the Rerun"/"The Ballad of Gilligan's Island" in which ALF dreams he's on Gilligan's Island; guest stars Bob Denver, Alan Hale, Dawn Wells and Russell Johnson reprise their Gilligan's Island roles. The chorus to rap group Big Tymers' Still Fly is said to be an interpolation of the section of the theme-song referring to the cast members.

Cancellation 
During the 1966–1967 television season, Gilligan's Island aired on Mondays at 7:30 p.m. Eastern time. Though the sitcom's ratings had fallen well out of the top-30 programs, during the last few weeks of its third season, the series was still winning its timeslot against its main competition, The Monkees, which aired at the same time on NBC-TV. Therefore, CBS assured Sherwood Schwartz that Gilligan's Island would definitely be picked up for a fourth year.

CBS, however, had signaled its intention to cancel the long-running Western series Gunsmoke, which had been airing late on Saturday nights during the 1966–1967 television season. Under pressure from CBS network president William S. Paley and his wife Babe, along with many network affiliates and longtime fans of Gunsmoke, CBS rescheduled the Western to an earlier time slot on Mondays at 7:30 p.m. eastern time. As a result, Gilligan's Island was quietly canceled at practically the last minute, while the cast members were all on vacation. Some of the cast had bought houses near the set, based on Sherwood Schwartz's verbal confirmation that the series would be renewed for a fourth season.

Nielsen ratings/television schedule

Film sequels 
Three television film sequels were made—the first independently, the other two by MCA/Universal Television.

In a 1978 television film, Rescue from Gilligan's Island, the castaways successfully leave the island but have difficulty reintegrating into society. During a reunion cruise on the first Christmas after their rescue, fate intervenes and they find themselves wrecked on the same island at the end of the film. It starred the original cast, except for Tina Louise, who refused to participate because of her disputes with the producers and who was replaced by Judith Baldwin. The plot involved Soviet agents seeking a memory disc from a spy satellite that landed on the island and facilitated their rescue.

In a 1979 sequel, The Castaways on Gilligan's Island, they are rescued once again and the Howells convert the island into a getaway resort with the other five castaways as "silent partners". Ginger was again played by Judith Baldwin.

In a second sequel, The Harlem Globetrotters on Gilligan's Island (1981), villains played by Martin Landau and then-wife Barbara Bain try to take over the island to gain access to a vein of "supremium", a valuable but volatile fictional element. This time, Ginger was played by Constance Forslund. They are thwarted by the timely intervention of the Harlem Globetrotters. Jim Backus, who was in poor health at the time, was written out of the script by saying Thurston Howell III was tending to Howell Industries back on the mainland. David Ruprecht played the role of his son, Thurston Howell IV, who was asked to manage the resort. However, Backus insisted on keeping continuity and made a cameo appearance at the end of the film.

In 2008, Sherwood Schwartz stated he would like a modern-day movie adaptation of Gilligan's Island with Michael Cera as Gilligan and Beyonce Knowles as Ginger.

Spin-offs and timelines 
The New Adventures of Gilligan is a Filmation-produced animated remake that aired on ABC on Saturday mornings from September 7, 1974, to September 4, 1977, for 24 episodes (16 installments airing in 1974–75 and eight new ones combined with repeats in 1975–76). The voices were provided by the original cast except for Ginger and Mary Ann (both were voiced by Jane Webb). Dawn Wells could not participate because she was in a touring production. An additional character was Gilligan's pet, Snubby the Monkey.

Gilligan's Planet is an animated science-fiction version produced by Filmation and starring the voices of the Gilligan's Island cast, save for Tina Louise (Dawn Wells voiced both Mary Ann and Ginger). In a follow-up to The New Adventures of Gilligan, the castaways escape from the island by building a spaceship and get shipwrecked on a distant planet. Only 12 episodes aired on CBS between September 18, 1982 and September 3, 1983. In the episode "Let Sleeping Minnows Lie", they travel to an island, get shipwrecked there and Gilligan observes, "First we were stranded on an island, then we were stranded on a planet and now we're stranded on an island on a planet."

Reunions and documentaries 

Good Morning America featured a Gilligan's Island reunion presided over by guest host Kathie Lee Gifford on November 26, 1982. The entire cast was present, except for Jim Backus who was unable to attend but appeared via a live video remote from Los Angeles.

All seven of the original cast members (along with Sherwood Schwartz) reunited on television for one last time on a 1988 episode of The Late Show with Ross Shafer.

In the Baywatch episode "Now Sit Right Back and You'll Hear a Tale" (S02E16), first aired in February 1992, Bob Denver and Dawn Wells re-take their original roles in a sequence dreamed by the lifeguard Eddie Kramer. The Baywatch co-creator, Douglas Schwartz, is a nephew of Sherwood Schwartz. The episode was written by Lloyd J. Schwartz, a son of Sherwood.

Gilligan's Island: Underneath the Grass Skirt is a 1999 documentary featuring Denver and Louise.

E! True Hollywood Story presented a backstage history of the show in 2000, featuring interviews with some of the stars or their widows.

Surviving Gilligan's Island (2001) is a docudrama in which Bob Denver, Dawn Wells and Russell Johnson reminisce about the show.

Related productions 

 Gilligan's Island: The Musical was first produced in the early 1990s, with a script by Lloyd Schwartz, Sherwood Schwartz's son and songs by Schwartz's daughter and son-in-law, Hope and Laurence Juber.
 Gilligan's Wake is a 2003 parallel novel loosely based on the 1960s CBS sitcom, from the viewpoints of the seven major characters, written by Esquire film and television critic Tom Carson. The title is derived from the title of the TV show and Finnegans Wake, the seminal work of Irish novelist James Joyce.
 On November 30, 2004, the TBS network launched a reality series titled The Real Gilligan's Island, which placed two groups of people on an island, leaving them to fend for themselves in the manner of Survivor – the catch being that each islander matched a character type established in the original series (a klutz, a sea captain, a movie star, a millionaire's wife, etc.). While heavily marketed by TBS, the show turned out to be a flop with a very Survivor-like feel, but little of its success. A second season began June 8, 2005, with two-hour episodes for four weeks. TBS announced in July 2005 that a third season of the show would not be produced.

Syndication 
Syndication is handled by Warner Bros. Television (under Turner Entertainment Co., which in 1986 acquired United Artists Television's share of the series as part of the classic pre-1986 Metro-Goldwyn-Mayer library). It aired on TBS from 1986 to 2003, where it also aired with colorization on season one for a while.  TBS would air Gilligan’s Island weekday mornings at 8:05am/et throughout the 90s often paired with Bewitched. TNT aired it at some point in the 1990s and also aired the colorized season one. Nick at Nite later aired the series from 2000 to 2001. It then shifted to TV Land, where it aired from 2001 to 2003 (and again from January to June 2014). Then, in 2004, it aired on Hallmark Channel.

In 2015, the show started to air nationally on MeTV.

Warner/Turner also handles the two Filmation-produced animated sequel series. The three TV movie sequels are handled by other companies.

In the UK Gilligan's Island had a very brief run on ITV in April 1965  but was dropped after 13 episodes.

It has briefly aired on MBC in the MENA region.

Home media 
Warner Home Video released all three seasons of Gilligan's Island on DVD in Region 1 between 2004 and 2005. The Complete First Season features all 36 episodes unedited with the original theme song in their original black-and-white format. The special features include the rare pilot episode with commentary with creator Sherwood Schwartz and three other featurettes.

The Complete Second Season includes all 32 season-two episodes in color. Bonuses for this set include: a season-two introduction with Russell Johnson and Sherwood Schwartz and audio commentary on the season's third episode, "The Little Dictator".

The Complete Third Season includes all 30 season-three episodes. Special features include a season introduction with Russell Johnson and Sherwood Schwartz, commentary on the season's fourth episode, "The Producer", guest-starring Phil Silvers and a 15-minute documentary titled Gilligan's Island: A Pop Culture Phenomenon.

The Complete Series Collection contains all the same bonuses and featurettes for a complete series box set in 2007. In April 2012, the series was reissued in new DVD releases.

The series is also available at the iTunes Store.

In August 2006, an executive at Warner Bros. announced plans that Gilligan's Island, in addition to other classic TV series owned by the studio, would be digitally re-mastered in HD. The original TV series was shot on high-resolution film but scaled down for broadcast.

On January 20, 2014, TV Land became the first network to air theatrical-style widescreen HD remastered episodes of Gilligan's Island. This marked the first time the WB remastered episodes were seen by fans and the general public.

HD remastered episodes have been made available for purchase through streaming media sources.

In other media 
Two board games based on the show, both called The Gilligan's Island Game featuring a monkey, Thurston Howell III, Gilligan and the Skipper on the box cover, were manufactured by Game Gems and released in 1965.  The New Adventures of Gilligan, based on the short-lived cartoon of the same name and featuring all castaways, was manufactured by Milton Bradley and was released in 1974.

A set of trading cards was released by Topps in 1965.  
A pinball machine, manufactured by Bally and based on the show, was released in May 1991. 
A video game based on the series, called The Adventures of Gilligan's Island and manufactured by Bandai, was released for the Nintendo Entertainment System in July 1990. The game features the likenesses of all the original castaways except for Ginger, who is completely absent from the game.  
A video slot machine, manufactured by International Game Technology and loosely based on the show, was released in 2004.

Ginger or Mary Ann? 
The question of which of these two characters fans of the show prefer has endured long after the end of the series. The question has inspired commercials, essays, videos and a sermon. By most accounts, the wholesome Mary Ann has consistently outpolled the glamorous movie-star Ginger by a sizable margin. Bob Denver admitted he was a Mary Ann fan. According to Bob Denver in a 2001 interview, Wells received 3,000–5,000 fan letters weekly, whereas Louise may have gotten 1,500 or 2,000.

References 
Notes

Bibliography

 
 
 
 
 
 Gilligan's Island – The Complete First Season (DVD), 2004, Turner Home Entertainment, UPC 053939673425.
 Gilligan's Island – The Complete Second Season (DVD), 2005, Turner Home Entertainment, UPC 053939692624.
 Gilligan's Island – The Complete Third Season (DVD), 2005, Turner Home Entertainment, UPC 053939733129.

External links 

 
 
 
 Sept 2014 interview with Dawn Wells

 
1960s American sitcoms
1964 American television series debuts
1967 American television series endings
Black-and-white American television shows
CBS original programming
English-language television shows
Nautical television series
Television shows adapted into films
Television shows adapted into video games
Television series about being lost from home
Television series set on fictional islands
Television series created by Sherwood Schwartz
Television series by United Artists Television
Comedy franchises